Shundi may refer to:

 Emperor Shun (disambiguation)
 Shundi (surname)